NGC 335 is a spiral galaxy in the constellation Cetus. It was discovered on October 9, 1885 by Francis Leavenworth. It was described by Dreyer as "very faint, pretty small, extended, brighter middle."

References

0335
18851009
Cetus (constellation)
Spiral galaxies
003544